Biser is a village in the municipality of Harmanli, in Haskovo Province, in southern Bulgaria.

Biser Point on Graham Coast in Antarctica is named after the village.

References

Villages in Haskovo Province